Roar Woldum (2 January 1933 – 21 January 2014) was a Norwegian freestyle swimmer. He competed in the two events at the 1952 Summer Olympics.

References

External links
 

1933 births
2014 deaths
Norwegian male freestyle swimmers
Olympic swimmers of Norway
Swimmers at the 1952 Summer Olympics
Sportspeople from Oslo
20th-century Norwegian people